Torchiarolo is a comune in the province of Brindisi in Apulia, on the south-east coast of Italy. Its main economic activities are tourism and the growing of olives and grapes.

References

Cities and towns in Apulia
Localities of Salento